The A483, officially described as the Swansea to Manchester Trunk Road, although now ending in Chester, is a major road in the United Kingdom.

Route description

Swansea
The A483 begins at the M4 motorway junction 42, just east of Swansea. It travels west along the Fabian Way towards Swansea city centre, where it turns to a northwesterly direction. It meets the M4 again at junction 47 at Penllergaer, after which it multiplexes with the A48 along Swansea Road, Bryntirion Road and Bolgoed Road to Pontarddulais.

Carmarthenshire
After Pontarddulais, the route continues along Heol Fforest and Carmarthen Road. It diverges from the A48 at the M4 junction 49, turning northeast towards Ammanford and then north towards Llandeilo. At Llandeilo it joins the A40, then multiplexes with this route as far as Llandovery. From here, it continues north into Powys.

Powys
The A483 continues through Llanwrtyd Wells, Builth Wells (where it intersects with the A470) and Llandrindod Wells. It intersects with the A44 at Crossgates, just north of Llandrindod Wells, then continues to Newtown, where it passes under the Cambrian Line at the Dolfor Road Railway Bridge. From Newtown, the road continues to Welshpool, running roughly parallel to the River Severn, before crossing the border into England at Llanymynech.

Shropshire
From Llanymynech, the A483 continues north, bypassing Oswestry. Here, it picks up a multiplex with the A5; the two routes then cross into Wales at Chirk.

Wrexham
After the A5 diverges to the west at Chirk, the A483 crosses the River Dee, then reaches Ruabon. Here, it becomes a dual carriageway with numbered grade-separated junctions.

Junction 1 – A539 Ruabon

Junction 2 – B5426 Johnstown

Junction 3 – A5152 Croesfoel

Junction 4 – A525 Ruthin Road

Junction 5 – A541 Mold Road

Junction 6 – A5156 (A534) Gresford

Junction 7 – B5102 Rossett

Cheshire
Just south of Chester, the A483 intersects with the A55 North Wales Expressway. It then continues as a single carriageway to its terminus at the city centre, crossing the Grosvenor Bridge over the Dee.

Future
There have been demands for a dual carriageway from Shrewsbury to Wrexham, including the section of the A483 from Oswestry to Ruabon; also a campaign by residents for a bypassing Llanymynech and Pant.

See also
Trunk roads in Wales

References

External links

 SABRE Roads by 10 – A483

Roads in Neath Port Talbot
Roads in Swansea
Roads in Carmarthenshire
Roads in Powys
Roads in Wrexham County Borough
Roads in Cheshire